Space Monster (known as Alien Invaders - Plus! in North America) is a fixed shooter video game for the Philips Magnavox Odyssey², a console released in 1978. Similar to Space Invaders, the object of the game is to destroy all invading aliens while also avoiding fire.

Gameplay 
The player controls a robot inside of the mobile laser cannon which is used to attack the enemy robots. The Merciless Monstroth (an eye shaped enemy that constantly moves back and forth across the top of the screen) leads the invasion force of 8 robots. Each robot has a cannon and is protected by an indestructible green shield. The shields constantly move back and forth giving both the player and the enemy the opportunity to fire. If the player's laser cannon is struck, they will be defenseless unless they retreat to under one of the three large black shields. Once the player fires, the shield will disappear and the laser cannon will reappear. If all three shields are lost, the Merciless Monstroth will engage the player until either all enemies are destroyed or the player is destroyed. First to win ten games wins the match.

Reception
Space Monster was reviewed by Video in its "Arcade Alley" column where it was described as "a surprisingly innovative switcheroo on good old Space Invaders". Despite noting that the game has only eight attackers, the reviewers argued that the game "is no pushover", and suggested that it is a "unique and interesting S-F videogame" and that it "makes a nice change of pace from the usual run of space-invasion games because it is less derivative by far than most of them".

See also 
List of Videopac games

References

1980 video games
Magnavox Odyssey 2 games
Video game clones
Fictional monsters
Fixed shooters
Video games about extraterrestrial life
Video games developed in the United States